Bobo may refer to:

Animals and plants
 Bobo (gorilla) a popular gorilla at the Woodland Park Zoo in Seattle from 1953 to 1968
 Bobo, Vietnamese name for Job's tears, a plant of south-east Asia

Entertainment, arts and media 
Bobo (magazine), a Dutch and Indonesian children's magazine which follows the adventures of Bobo, a blue rabbit
 The Bobo, a 1967 film starring Peter Sellers

Comic strips
 Bobo (Belgian comics)
 Bobo (Italian comics)
 Bobo (Swedish comics)

Fictional characters
 Bobo the Bear, in The Muppets series
 Professor Bobo, from Mystery Science Theater 3000
 Bobo Gigliotti, the psychotic boss of "Fat Pizza" from the Australian comedy TV series Pizza and Fat Pizza
 Bobo, pet cat of Doris Husselmeyer in the comic strip Piranha Club
 Bobo Peterson, a character in the 1992 TV comedy Revenge of the Nerds III

Music
 BoBo (band), a Chinese boy band formed in 2007 
 "Bobo" (J Balvin song), 2016
 "Bobo" (Olamide song), 2015
 "Bobo" (Aya Nakamura song), 2021
 "Bobo", a 2021 song by Bad Gyal, Mariah Angeliq and María Becerra
 "Les Bobos", a 2006 song by Renaud

People 
 Bobo people (or Bobo-Fing), an ethnic group of Burkina Faso
 Bobo (socio-economic group), French portmanteau for "bourgeois-bohemian", describing France's elite
 Bobo (nickname)
 Bobo (given name), a list of people
 Bobo (surname), a list of people
 Bobô (footballer, born 1962), Brazilian retired footballer and head coach Raimundo Nonato Tavares da Silva
 Bobô (footballer, born 1985), Brazilian footballer Deyvison Rogério da Silva
 José Claudeon dos Santos (born 1985), Brazilian footballer also known as Bobô
 Bobo (singer), German singer-songwriter Christiane Hebold
 DJ BoBo (born 1968), Swiss musician Peter René Cipiriano Baumann
 Bobo Brazil, American wrestler Houston Harris
 Scarlett BoBo, Canadian drag queen

Places 
 Bobo, Georgia, an unincorporated community in the United States
 Bobo, Mississippi (disambiguation), multiple communities in the United States
 Bobo Ridge, Ross Dependency, Antarctica
 Bobo River, New South Wales, Australia
 Bobo-Dioulasso, a city in Burkina Faso, sometimes shortened to Bobo

Sports teams
 ASF Bobo, a football club based in Bobo Dioulasso, Burkina Faso
 RC Bobo, a football club based in Bobo Dioulasso, Burkina Faso

Other uses 
Bo-Bo, a type of locomotive
Bobó de camarão or shrimp bobo, a Brazilian dish made of shrimp cooked on a manioc pureé
Bobo doll experiment, a 1960s test of human aggression
 Bobo, a bogeyman-like monster in Poland
Bobo brand, a product that is sold inexpensively under a relatively unfamiliar brand name

See also 
 BO2 (disambiguation)
 Boba (disambiguation)
 Bobô (disambiguation)
 Bobobo, a Japanese manga series
 Buba